Cinderella is a TV film released on January 1, 2000, in the UK, directed by Beeban Kidron. The cast is led by Kathleen Turner, who plays the Wicked Stepmother Claudette. The film follows the original idea of the fairytale classic but is based in a modern world full of fashion and technology.

Plot
In this version of Cinderella, the heroine is called Zezolla (Marcella Plunkett) and still grieves the loss of her mother; where as her father (David Warner) is more interested in pleasing his new harpy of a wife, Claudette (Kathleen Turner) and her shallow daughters, Gonril and Regan (Katrin Cartlidge and Lucy Punch). Zezolla is treated cruelly and made to work as a servant, while Claudette slowly poisons her father after she discovers that he isn't rich. Zezolla's only friends are the elderly butler Felim (Leslie Philips) and Mab (Jane Birkin) the mermaid like lady who lives behind a waterfall. Meanwhile, the Queen of the land is frustrated with her ‘lazy’ son, Prince Valiant who won't pick a wife, he's not interested in love, love isn't cool, he only likes cool things, until he sees Zezolla. Cinderella does go to the ball but her intent is to sabotage Claudette's plans to find a new husband. While dancing older men away from her evil stepmother, the Prince falls in love with her at first sight. The two would be lovers share a precious few moments together before she has to jump back into a pool she fell out of as the clock strikes midnight. Just as all Cinderella stories continue, so does this version.

The world in which this story is set is slightly bizarre. With a mixture of periods, expressed through fashion and music but still maintaining a sense of magic and wonder. The fairy godmother role is given to the a mermaid like woman who lives in a cave behind a waterfall that only lets certain people through. Mab, doesn't like people and is off handed at first with Zezolla and nearly doesn't help her get to the ball. A contrast to the extravagant carriage and over the top dress with an assortment of animals turned into servants, this Cinderella seems to be new age and possibly on a budget.

As the Wicked Step Mother, Kathleen Turner is obviously having fun with the role she was born to play, its just a shame there isn't more for her to do. She flexes her scheming and cruel muscles but isn't given room to go further.

Cast

Reception
In 2000, Cinderella was one of Channel Four International's top selling programmes of the year. The film has received positive reviews. Television critic Kevin McDonough described the film as "a smashing new adaptation of Cinderella," in which he praised Kathleen Turner's performance as "wickedly good" and concluded, "Cinderella features stunning cinematography, fabulous costumes, and the best role for Ms. Turner in years." Julie Salamon of The New York Times described the film as an "amusing, overheated pop version of the fairy tale" that "combines the romantic overtones of gothic thrillers...with fanciful music-video imagery. The evil stepmother (Kathleen Turner) wears fabulous neon clothes with exaggerated shapes..." Salamon also said, "This film has many virtues." Authors Elizabeth Ford and Deborah Mitchell of The Makeover in Movies called the film "visually exciting" and that "natural images dominate the tale...The expressionistic use of fantastic color, light and plenty of watery distortion create a magical mood. Its setting suggests a cross between Finland and Disney-world". Mike Davies of Birmingham Post called the film "ambitious" and stated, "Best of all, though, was the re-emergence of Kathleen Turner, chewing the scenery as gold-digging Claudette..." USA Today described Cinderella as "a true pleasure that's filmed with visual style and verbal wit."

Releases
Cinderella has been released on several formats. In 2000, Cinderella was released in the UK on videocassette by 4Learning. 4Learning's video comprised the film in three parts, followed by a documentary The Many Cinderellas, in a total of four 30 minute programmes. The film on videocassette was viewed in schools for educational purposes and activities. In 2002, Educational Media Australia also released the film on videocassette. In 2005, Cinderella was officially released in Taiwan on VCD and DVD by Gull Multimedia International. The DVD had audio in English with removable Chinese subtitles and was packaged with an accompanying booklet in Chinese. In 2006, the film was released in Japan on VHS and DVD (rental only and retail versions) under the translated Japanese title  シンデレラ by Transformer, and in Australia on DVD by educational resources distributor VEA Group (including Classroom Video). In 2018, the film was released in the United States and U.S. territories as a streaming online video by Amazon Prime, Roku and Tubi, and in the United Kingdom on DVD by Simply Media.

References

External links
 
Cinderella educational website (film notes and activities) - Channel4Learning.com
Cinderella at Projector Pictures

Films based on Cinderella
Films directed by Beeban Kidron
2000 television films
2000 films
Films based on Charles Perrault's Cinderella